The 1927 Brown Bears football team represented Brown University as an independent during the 1927 college football season. Led by second-year head coach Tuss McLaughry, the Bears compiled a record of 3–6–1.

Schedule

References

Brown
Brown Bears football seasons
Brown Bears football